The Midob people are an ethnic group from the Meidob Hills region in Darfur, Sudan. They speak Midob, one of the Nubian languages (part of the larger family of Nilo-Saharan languages). The population of this ethnic group possibly exceeds 50,000.

The Midob's roots are claimed go back to Meroitic Kingdom (Kingdom of Kush) in Northern Sudan. It is not clear if linguistics is in support of this, as the linguistic relationship of Nubian languages with the Meroitic language is still debated. Nevertheless, historians like Brown (The history Of Sudanese Tribes) mention that Midob was the ruling family in the Nubian Civilization and their roots extended to the pharaohs of Ancient Egypt.

References

Joshua Project

Ethnic groups in Sudan